Ronald Davis (born 1937) is American Abstract Geometric painter.

Ronald Davis or Ron Davis may also refer to:

Sports
 Ronald Davis (field hockey) (1914–1989), British field hockey player
 Ron Davis (outfielder) (1941–1992), right-handed Major League Baseball outfielder
 Ron Davis (basketball) (born 1954), American basketball player
 Ron Davis (pitcher) (born 1955), former Major League Baseball pitcher
 Ron Davis (defensive back) (born 1972), American football player

Other
Ronald Davis (physician) (1956–2008), American physician
Ron Davis (filmmaker), American documentary filmmaker
Ron Davis (jazz musician), pianist and composer based in Toronto, Canada
Ronnie Davis (1950–2017), Jamaican reggae singer
Ronald W. Davis (born 1941), biochemist and geneticist at Stanford University
Ronald Bramwell-Davis (1905–1974), cricketer and British Army officer
Ronald L. Davis, American law enforcement officer and government official

See also
Ronald Davies (disambiguation)